The International Precision Rifle Federation (IPRF) is an international federation for field and long range shooting. The shooting takes place from various positions and at varied distances within a limited par time, so that the competitors need to have a good understanding about their ballistics so that they can compensate for wind and distance. Competitors are divided into different divisions based on their firearms and equipment. All competitors compete inside their division, and there can also be awards for the categories women, junior (competitors of 18 years or younger), senior (competitors of 55 years or older) and military/police. A match usually consists of several stages, and points are awarded by the number of hits. Steel targets are used to a large degree to make it easy to score points and as an economical alternative to electronic targets. Referees often use spotting scopes to observe and count hits.

History 
PRS shooting in its current form originated in the USA in the 2010s in the Precision Rifle Series, which continues to this day as the american arm om precision rifle shooting. The National Rifle League (NRL) is another U.S. organization for precision rifle shooting. In the USA, the number of active competitors increased from 164 in 2012 to over 15 000 in 2020.

In 2021 the International Precision Rifle Federation (IPRF) was founded, and in 2022 the first world championship was held at the Bitche Military Camp in Bitche, France.

IPRF has affiliated associations in several countries:

 Australia: Australian Precision Rifle Association 
 Austria: Austrian Precision Rifle Association
 Canada: Canadian Precision Rifle Association 
 Chile: Federación Chilena de Rifles de Precisión
 Czechia: Chezh Precision Rifle Association
 France: French precision Rifle Association 
 Georgia: Georgian Precision Rifle Federation
 Germany: Deutsche Precision Rifle Association 
 Great Britain: Great Britain Precision Rifle Association 
 Greece: Hellenic Shooting Federation
 Hungary: Hungarian Dynamic Shooting Sport Federation 
 Indonesia: Indonesian Precision Rifle Association
 Ireland: Irish Precision Rifle Association
 Italy: PRS Italia  
 Lithuania: Lithuania Practical Shooting Sport Federation 
 Namibia: Namibian Precision Rifle Association
 Norway: Precision Rifle Norway 
 Poland: Polish Precision Rifle Association
 Russia: Rossniping Tactical Shooting Association  (Voluntarily withdrawn until further notice)
 Slovakia: Slovak Precision Rifle Association
 Slovenia: Slovenia Precision Rifle Association
 South Africa: South African Precision Rifle Federation  
 Spain: Spanish Precision Rifle Association 
 Sweden: Swedish Shooting Sport Federation 
 United States: United States Precision Rifle Association

Equipment divisions 
The participants are divided into separate divisions based on the type of equipment used. It is common to use scopes with adjustable magnification, and cartdidges with calibers between 6 mm and 6.5 mm (for example 6 mm Dasher, 6.5 mm Creedmoor or 6.5×55 mm) because these tend to provide good ballistics at typical match distances and relatively little recoil. Internationally, the divisions used are Open (most permitted modifications), Limited and Factory (factory firearms with few modifications). Locally, other divisions may be used or none at all.

Matches 
All competitors go through the same stages regardless of registered division and category. It is mainly competed individually, but at larger events there can also be team competitions where the results from the individual team members are pooled together to achieve a teams core.

2022 World Championships 
In 2022 the first World Championship was held by the French Army 16e bataillon de chasseurs à pied and Ultimate Ballistics at the Bitche Military Camp in Bitche France.

 Open

 Teams Open

 Limited

 Teams Limited

 Factory

 Teams Factory

See also 
 International T-Class Confederation (ITCC), a similar shooting sport
 International Confederation of Fullbore Rifle Associations (ICFRA), the international shooting confederation for Palma and F-Class

References 

Shooting sports organizations
Shooting sports